Blu-Billion (stylized as Blu-BiLLioN) is a Japanese visual kei rock band formed in 2010. Their single "S.O.S." reached the eighth place on the weekly Oricon Singles Chart. In January 2020, the Blu-Billion announced that they would disband on April 5 due to the illness of their leader and drummer Seika.

Discography

Albums

Singles

References

External links
 

Visual kei musical groups
Japanese rock music groups
Musical groups established in 2010
2010 establishments in Japan